Zhao Shu-zhen (born c. 1944) is a Chinese film, stage and television actress. She is best known internationally for her portrayal of the grandmother (Nai Nai 奶奶 Nǎi​nai, which means paternal grandmother in Mandarin) in Lulu Wang's film The Farewell (2019), which earned her many accolades including the Independent Spirit Award for Best Supporting Female.

Career
Zhao has appeared in over 100 plays for the Harbin Grand Theatre.

Zhao's role as Nai Nai in The Farewell has received critical acclaim and numerous awards. For the role, she won Best Supporting Actress from the San Diego Film Critics Society Awards 2019, the Houston Film Critics Society Awards 2019, and the 2019 Chicago Indie Critics Awards and a 2020 Independent Spirit Award for Best Supporting Female.

Filmography

Film

Television

Awards and nominations

References

External links
 

Living people
Actresses from Harbin
Chinese film actresses
Chinese stage actresses
Chinese television actresses
Independent Spirit Award for Best Supporting Female winners
Date of birth missing (living people)
1944 births